The Geezinslaw Brothers, also known as The Geezinslaws, was an Austin, Texas-based country music comedy duo consisting of Sammy Allred and Dewayne "Son" Smith. They performed for more than 50 years and released numerous recordings over a 40+ year span from 1963 to 2005.

The group started as The Geezinslaw Brothers in the 1950s. They once opened for Elvis Presley and were regulars on the Louisiana Hayride radio show.

In 1961, Arthur Godfrey invited them on his show, giving the duo their big break. They landed a record deal with Columbia Records and released their debut album The Kooky World of the Geezinslaw Brothers in 1963. They moved to New York City and  changed record labels to Capitol Records, where they recorded four more albums between 1966 and 1969. The duo made the country Top 100 three times during their stint with Capitol, but never cracked the Top 40.

The Geezinslaw Brothers made guest appearances on The Ed Sullivan Show, The Jackie Gleason Show and Hootenanny (U.S. TV series) and toured with Roger Miller and Perry Como. They became regulars on Ralph Emery's radio program Pop! Goes the Country. In 1986, they appeared on Nashville Now, another show hosted by Ralph Emery. They also made guest appearances on "The Jimmy Dean Show", an hour long country variety show.

The Geezinslaw Brothers released only one album each decade in the 1970s and 1980s. In 1979, they released an album for Willie Nelson's Short Lived Lone Star Label titled "If You Think I'm Crazy Now..." In 1989, the band, now calling themselves just The Geezinslaws, released a self-titled album on the Step One label.

In 1993, the group received the National Association of Record Merchandisers "Indie Best Seller Award" for their recording, Feelin' Good, Gittin' Up, Gittin' Down. This album also gave them their first chart single in over two decades with "Help, I’m White and I Can't Get Down."

The group appeared on Austin City Limits three times. The Austin Music Awards inducted The Geezinslaws into its Hall of Fame for 2005.

The Geezinslaws last release, Eclectic Horsemen (2005), has guest performances by Willie Nelson, Kinky Friedman and Kelly Willis.

Sammy Allred also worked in radio on and off for over forty years, much of the time as a radio personality on KVET in Austin. He is a member of the Texas Radio Hall of Fame and won the Country Music Association Personality of the Year Award in 2006 and 2007 and the Billboard Personality of the Year Award in 1971 and 1997. 

Sammy Allred died at age 84 on May 9, 2018, in Austin, Texas. Dewayne Smith died on March 16, 2019.

Discography

Albums

Singles

Music videos

References

Musical groups from Austin, Texas
Country music duos
Country music groups from Texas
Capitol Records artists
Step One Records artists
Musical groups established in 1963
Musical groups disestablished in 2005
1963 establishments in Texas